St. Brendan High School is a co-educational private Catholic high school in the Westchester census-designated place in Miami-Dade County, Florida. The school is part of the Archdiocese of Miami.

History
St. Brendan High School was originally St. John Vianney Minor Seminary High School, which opened in 1959 to accept students who were interested in studying for the priesthood. When enrollment declined, the Roman Catholic Archdiocese of Miami, decided to convert the school into a co-educational high school. They changed its name to St. Brendan High School and it opened at the start of the 1975 school year.

It is part of the Archdiocese of Miami. The school is primarily committed to serving the educational needs of the Catholic population of the southwest section of Miami. In 1975, 346 students were enrolled in the ninth and tenth grades. By 1977, 870 students were enrolled in the ninth, tenth, eleventh, and twelfth grades.

Athletics
The following sports are offered at St. Brendan:

Basketball
Baseball
Cheerleading
Cross Country
Soccer
Softball
Swimming
Tennis
Track & Field
Volleyball
Lacrosse
Football
Dance

Notable alumni
 Antonietta Collins, sportscaster for ESPN SportsCenter
 Jose Felix Diaz, State of Florida Representative
 Bob Ducsay, film editor and producer
 Adalberto Jordan, judge on United States Court of Appeals for the Eleventh Circuit
 Natalie Martinez, actress
 Jorge Masvidal, mixed martial artist
 Marilyn Milian, The People's Court
 Jackie Nespral, journalist

See also
Christopher Columbus High School (Miami-Dade County)

References

External links
School website
St. John Vianney Seminary

 

Educational institutions established in 1975
Catholic secondary schools in Florida
Roman Catholic Archdiocese of Miami
Private high schools in Miami-Dade County, Florida
Marist Brothers schools
1975 establishments in Florida
Westchester, Florida